A student-run advertising agency acts like a real advertising agency, but is operated by students. The agency can be included in the academic curriculum, allowing students to work in the agency for academic credit. Or, the agency can simply be housed within the academic unit, allowing students to work in the agency for volunteer experience. In other cases, the agency can operate as a student club within the broader organizational structure of the university. The student-run agency provides advertising and similar communications services (public relations, marketing, social media, etc.) to various organizations such as college departments, small businesses, and community-based non-profit organizations. Some agencies compete with professionals and charge for services. Other agencies do all their work without charge. Other agencies have a philanthropic focus whereby communications work is conducted for free for nonprofits, while for-profit entities are asked to make a charitable donation to the agency to support its learner-centered focus. Most student-run agencies tend to take an integrated marketing communications focus, combining advertising with public relations and other services.

As is the case with communications agencies in the real world, student-run agencies typically offer a variety of support to clients, including public relations, marketing, promotions, and social media support. The main appeal of a student-run advertising agency for clients is that the agency can provide professional-quality work at no cost or very small cost. The primary appeal for students is that they gain real-world experience unlike anything that can result from a traditional classroom experience. Students working in this environment have to mentor each other. Students learn to engage in "reverse mentoring" whereby they typically have more experience and knowledge of communication than their clients - so they must educate the clients. In all agency environments, development of time management and teamwork skills is essential. Students must collaborate to produce work that satisfies the client and the agency supervisor (typically a faculty member). The work must be academically appropriate and professionally relevant. This balance of responsibilities and oversight makes the student-run agency an ideal learning experience and preparation for the professional workplace.

External links

Avery, J. R., & Marra, J. L. (1992, August). Student-run advertising agency: A showcase for student work. Paper presented at the annual meeting of the Association for Education in Journalism and Mass Communication, Montreal, Quebec, Canada. Available from: http://eric.ed.gov/?id=ED351711

Busch, A.M. (2013). A professional project surveying student-run advertising and public relations agencies at institutions with ACEJMC accredited programs. Theses and Professional Projects from the College of Journalism and Mass Communications, Paper 35. University of Nebraska-Lincoln, Lincoln, Nebraska. Retrieved from http://digitalcommons.unl.edu/cgi/viewcontent.cgi?article=1040&context=journalismdiss

Bush, L., Ranta, J., & Vincent, H. (2018). The student-run agency: Transitioning from student to professional. Dubuque, IA: KendallHunt.

Bush, L. (2015). Commentary: Ten considerations for developing and maintaining a student-run communications agency. Journal of Advertising Education, 19(1), 26-28.

Bush, L. (2009). Student public relations agencies: A qualitative study of the pedagogical benefits, risks, and a framework for success. Journalism & Mass Communication Educator, 64 (1), 27-38

Bush, L., Haygood, D., & Vincent, H. (2017). Student-run communications agencies: Providing students with real-world experiences that impact their careers. Journalism & Mass Communication Educator, 72(4), 410-424.

Bush, L., & Miller, B.M. (2011). U.S. student-run agencies: Organization, attributes and adviser perceptions of student learning outcomes. Public Relations Review, 37(5), 485-491.

Comcowich, W. (2018, February 15). Student PR agencies offer more than experience. Glean. Retrieved from: https://glean.info/student-run-pr-agencies-offer-experience/

Deemer, R. A. (2012). An evaluative measure for outputs in student-run public relations firms and applied courses (Order No. 3507906). Available from ProQuest Dissertations & Theses Global. (1017537587).

Habib, S., Patwardhan, P., Sheehan, K., Phelps, J., Vincent, H., et al. (2016). Creating unique experimental opportunities: The case for student led ad agencies. Paper presented at the American Academy of Advertising Conference, Lubbock, Texas. (Available through ABI/INFORM)
 
Haley, J., Ritsch, M., & Smith, J. (2015). The best of both worlds: Student perspectives on student-run advertising and public relations agencies. Journal of Public Relations Education, 2, 19-33.

Hays, B. A, & Swanson, D. J. (2012). Public relations practitioners’ use of reverse mentoring in
the development of powerful professional relationships. PRism, The Online Journal of Public Relations, 9. (n.p.) http://www.prismjournal.org/fileadmin/9_2/Hays_Swanson.pdf

Kiah, C.-M. (2015, Oct. 12). Student-run communications agency provides real-world experience. FIU News. https://news.fiu.edu/2015/10/student-run-pr-agency-provides-real-world-experience/93009

Kim, C. (2015, Summer). Pedagogical approaches to student-run PR firms using service learning: A case study. Teaching Journalism and Mass Communications, 5, 1, 57-68. 
Kniess, A. (2008). Maybe student-run agency isn't so small after all. Advertising Age, 79(35), 16. 

Limoges, A. (2015). An analysis of successful student-run public relations and advertising agencies. Elon Journal of Undergraduate Research in Communications. Available from: http://www.inquiriesjournal.com/articles/1366/an-analysis-of-successful-student-run-public-relations-and-advertising-agencies

Maben, S. K. (2010). A Mixed Method Analysis of Undergraduate Student-run Public Relations Firms on U.S. College Campuses (Doctoral Dissertation). University of North Texas, Denton, Texas. Retrieved from: http://digital.library.unt.edu/ark:/67531/metadc30486/

Maben, S., & Whitson, K. (2014). Undergraduate transformations: Reported observations from advisers at U.S. student-run public relations firms. Teaching Journalism & Mass Communication, 4(1), 1-12. 

Marcketti, S. B., & Karpova, E. (2014). Getting ready for the real world: Student perspectives on bringing industry collaboration into the classroom. Journal of Family and Consumer Sciences, 106(1), 27-31.

Pritchard, B., & Smith, S. (2015). The public relations firm (1st ed.). US: Business Expert Press.
Ranta, J. A. (2016). Measuring strategic communications (Order No. 10127032). Available from ProQuest Dissertations & Theses Global. (1809108614). 
 
Struthers, A. (2016). Experiential education in a student-run startup: A case study of a university student-led communications agency (Order No. 10103360). Available from ProQuest Central; ProQuest Dissertations & Theses Global. (1787842761).

Swanson, D. J. (2019, January 22). The growing popularity of student-run agencies. O’Dwyer’s. Available from: https://www.odwyerpr.com/story/public/11923/2019-01-22/growing-popularity-student-run-pr-agencies.htm

Swanson, D. J. (2018). Connecting ethics and practice as PR students transition from learners to educators. In C. A. Hickerson and B. R. Brunner (Eds.), Translating values into conduct: Cases in public relations ethics. New York: Oxford University Press.
https://global.oup.com/ushe/product/cases-in-public-relations-9780190631383?cc=us&lang=en&

Swanson, D. J. (2018, May). Student-run PR agencies and the three Rs: REALITY, RIGOR, RESPONSIBILITY. PRSA Educators Academy Online Community. Available from: https://works.bepress.com/dswanson/90/ 

Swanson, D. J. (2017). Real world career preparation: A guide to creating a university student-run communications agency. London: Peter Lang. https://www.peterlang.com/view/product/31685

Swanson, D. J. (2017, October). Opportunities abound with university student-run PR agencies. Public Relations TACTICS. Available from: https://apps.prsa.org/Intelligence/Tactics/Articles/view/12056/1148/Rewarding_Collaborations_Opportunities_Abound_With#.WdxMdxNSyq

Swanson, D. J. (2014, October 11). Assessing public relations student learning and performance in ‘real world’ client campaigns and projects. Research Roundtable Pedagogical Poster Session, Educators Academy, Public Relations Society of America International Conference, Washington, DC.  http://works.bepress.com/dswanson/72

Swanson, D. J. (2011). The student-run public relations firm in an undergraduate program:
Reaching learning and professional development goals through ‘real world’ experience. Public Relations Review, 37, 5, 499-505.  Available at: http://works.bepress.com/dswanson/38/

Swanson, D. J. (2008). Training future PR practitioners and serving the community through a “learn by doing” undergraduate university curriculum. Public Relations Quarterly, 52(3), 15-20.
Available at: http://works.bepress.com/dswanson/51/

Vizcarrondo, N. L. (2005, June 9). Student entrepreneurs create campus businesses. The Harvard Crimson. Retrieved from: http://www.thecrimson.com/article/2005/6/9/student-entrepreneurs-create-campus-businesses-for/

Witmer, D. F., & Swanson, D. J. (2016). Public relations management: A team-based approach (2 Ed.). Dubuque, IA: KendallHunt.

Advertising agencies
Advertising industry
Student organizations
Student mass media